The 2018 Asia Rugby Championship division tournaments refers to the divisions played within the annual international rugby union tournament for the Asian region. The Asia Rugby Championship (ARC) replaced the Asian Five Nations tournament in 2015. The main tournament is now contested by the top three teams in Asia. The other national teams in Asia compete in three divisions.

Teams
The teams involved in the division tournaments:

Division 1
  (56)
  (58)

Division 2
  (63)
  (84)
  (77)

Division 3

West
  (NA)
  (NA)
  (NA)
  (NA)

Central
  (61)
  (NA)
  (91)
  (NA)

East
  (NA)
  (87)
  (69)

Note:
The national teams from United Arab Emirates, Sri Lanka (both Division I) and Laos (Division 3 East) were originally scheduled to play in their respective divisions, but withdrew prior to the draw being finalised.

Division 1

The Division 1 tournament consists of two matches between the Philippines and Singapore on 23 and 26 June. Both games took place at Southern Plains in Calamba, Laguna.

Fixtures

Division 2

The Division 2 tournament was held during May 2018 in Pattaya, Thailand.

Fixtures

Division 3 West

The Division 3 West tournament was held during April 2018 in Beirut, Lebanon.

Division 3 East

The Division 3 East tournament was held during May 2018 in Brunei.

Fixtures

Division 3 Central

The Division 3 Central tournament was held during May 2018 in Almaty, Kazakhstan.

The third place play off was not played as Kyrgyzstan did not show.

References

2018
2018 in Asian rugby union
2018 rugby union tournaments for national teams